Naughty but Nice is a 1927 American silent romantic comedy film directed by Millard Webb. Colleen Moore plays Bernice Sumners, a hayseed sent to a ritzy boarding school for finishing after her family strikes it rich in oil.

Plot 
Bernice Sumners is sent to a finishing school by her Texas uncle after oil is discovered on his property. At the school she blossoms into a young woman. Bernice is a compulsive liar. One evening she and a friend go to a hotel before a theater date, planning to meet popular Paul Carroll, but they run into the school principal in the hotel lobby. Bernice tells a lie about why they are there, and from there one lie builds upon the other until Bernice ends up in the hotel room of Ralph Ames of the Secret Service, who is in the process of changing (thus, the poster graphic of a man's bare legs in garters). Bernice calls Ralph her husband, and he plays along until the house of cards comes crumbling down around her. She ends up falling for the popular Paul Carroll, and the two marry.

Cast 
 Colleen Moore as Berenice Summers
 Donald Reed as Paul Carroll
 Claude Gillingwater as Judge John R. Altwold
 Kathryn McGuire as Alice Altwold
 Hallam Cooley as Ralph Ames
 Edythe Chapman as Mrs. Altwold
 Clarissa Selwynne as Miss Perkins
 Burr McIntosh as Uncle Seth Summers

Cast notes:
Loretta Young appeared in Naughty but Nice unbilled. She was known as Gretchen Young at that time.

References 
Notes

Bibliography
Codori, Jeff (2012), Colleen Moore; A Biography of the Silent Film Star, McFarland.  (print),  (e-book)

External links 
 
 
 
 
 

1927 films
1927 comedy films
American black-and-white films
Silent American comedy films
American silent feature films
Films directed by Millard Webb
Films set in schools
First National Pictures films
1920s American films